WNOL-TV (channel 38) is a television station in New Orleans, Louisiana, United States, airing programming from The CW. It is owned and operated by network majority owner Nexstar Media Group alongside ABC affiliate WGNO (channel 26). Both stations share studios at The Galleria in Metairie, while WNOL-TV's transmitter is located in Chalmette, Louisiana.

History

The station first signed on the air on March 25, 1984. It was the second independent station to sign on in the New Orleans market, after eventual sister station WGNO, which signed on the air in October 1967; the station maintained a general entertainment format, running a variety of cartoons, sitcoms, older movies, drama series and religious programs (many of which were formerly carried by WGNO). The station's original slogan, "Don't Stay Home Without Us," was an homage to the popular American Express advertising campaign featuring Karl Malden.

In 1985, the station was sold to the TVX Broadcast Group. In July of that year, WNOL became the first commercial station in New Orleans (second station after PBS member WYES-TV) to begin stereo broadcasts. WNOL, as with TVX's other television stations, became a charter affiliate of Fox when the network launched on October 9, 1986. (The station's schedule continued to represent more of an independent station as Fox's lone series at that time was a late night talk show, and they wouldn't start a full seven days of programming until 1993.) Reportedly, WGNO passed on the Fox affiliation; after that occurred, TVX used WNOL as leverage to get Fox to sign a deal to affiliate with the majority of the company's independent stations. TVX acquired Taft Broadcasting's independent and Fox-affiliated stations in 1987. Subsequently, the following year, TVX began selling off many of its television stations; in 1989, TVX sold WNOL to Qwest Broadcasting, a company owned by minority investors led by musician Quincy Jones. In addition to Fox network programming, WNOL continued to offer cartoons, sitcoms, movies, and drama series on its schedule into the 1990s.

In March 1994, Fox entered into a partnership with minority-owned communications firm Savoy Pictures (which would serve as majority partner) to form SF Broadcasting. On August 25 of that year, SF Broadcasting announced that it would acquire three television stations from Burnham Broadcasting—among them, New Orleans's longtime ABC affiliate WVUE (channel 8)—adding those stations alongside a fourth Burnham station that SF had acquired two months earlier in a separate deal. As part of the deal, WVUE and the three other acquired stations (WLUK-TV in Green Bay, KHON-TV in Honolulu and WALA-TV in Mobile) would switch their respective network affiliations from ABC (on WVUE) and NBC (on the three other stations) to Fox beginning in the fall of 1995. The Fox affiliation moved to WVUE on January 1, 1996; unlike the "Big Three" affiliates that switched to Fox through a similar deal between the network and New World Communications, WVUE and the other former Burnham stations also carried the Fox Kids weekday and Saturday blocks. The switch spawned a three-way affiliation swap in the market as WNOL joined The WB, a network that had been carried from the network's launch in January 1995 on WGNO (the result of that station's ownership by network part-owner Tribune Broadcasting)—which in turn picked up the ABC affiliation from WVUE. WNOL also acquired select cartoons and other syndicated programs that were previously part of WGNO's programming inventory. As the 1990s progressed, WNOL began to decrease its reliance on classic sitcoms, and gradually added more talk and reality series for the station's daytime schedule. After Fox picked up the rights to air NFL games in 1994, channel 38, via the NFL on Fox, succeeded WWL-TV as the New Orleans Saints' station of record; it only served in this role for the 1994 and 1995 seasons; in 1996, WVUE-TV took over this role. Unlike most of the outgoing Fox affiliates that were affiliated with UPN or The WB, WNOL-TV did not retain the Fox Kids block, due to in part that WVUE being owned by SF Broadcasting, agreed to carry the block. In contrast, any of the New World stations declined to carry the block.

WGNO's owner Tribune Broadcasting, which held a minority ownership interest in The WB, entered into a local marketing agreement to operate WNOL in 1996; Tribune purchased the station outright in 2000, following the company's merger with Qwest, creating the first television duopoly in the New Orleans market between WNOL and WGNO. Along with other similarly formatted stations, WNOL began to scale back on carrying cartoons (such as The Wacky World of Tex Avery) beginning in 2000. Cartoons on the station were eventually relegated to weekends only, when The WB discontinued the Kids' WB weekday afternoon block in December 2005, leaving its existing Saturday morning block.

Hurricane Katrina
When Hurricane Katrina hit the New Orleans metropolitan area on August 29, 2005, the storm destroyed the transmitter facilities of both WNOL and WGNO. The two stations set up temporary analog transmitter facilities from a multi-purpose tower in Algiers; WGNO and WNOL also partnered with i: Independent Television affiliate (now Ion Television owned-and-operated station) WPXL-TV (channel 49) to transmit its digital signals as separate subchannels on that station. On March 29, 2008, WNOL began transmitting its digital signal from a new tower in Metairie, broadcasting on UHF channel 15, ending the relay of both stations on WPXL. Tribune management decided that since it elected to relocate WGNO's digital signal to its analog-era UHF channel 26 when most full-power stations switched to digital-only transmissions in 2009, that it would instead flash-cut WGNO's digital signal on the air upon the transition and instead carry WGNO's digital signal as a digital subchannel of WNOL in the interim.

From March 29, 2008, to June 12, 2009, WNOL's digital signal was divided into a high definition feed for WGNO on digital channel 15.1 (mapped to virtual channel 26.1) that transmitted in ABC's recommended 720p resolution format, while WNOL's digital feed transmitted in 480i standard definition on digital channel 15.2 (mapped as virtual channel 38.1); Cox Communications continued to carry an HD feed of WNOL (presented in 1080i) via a fiber-optic connection over the provider's HD tier to allow high definition broadcasts of CW network programming to continue in some form. When WGNO's analog signal was shut down on June 12, 2009, that station moved its programming to its newly separate digital channel on UHF 26, allowing WNOL to resume broadcasting HD programming in 1080i for the first time since August 2005.

From The WB to The CW
On January 24, 2006, Time Warner and CBS Corporation announced that the two companies would launch The CW, a network developed as a joint venture between the two companies that initially featured a mix of programming from both The WB and UPN (the latter of which was acquired by CBS less than a month before the merger announcement on December 31, 2005, after its split from Viacom was finalized). The network signed a ten-year affiliation agreement with Tribune Broadcasting to affiliate with 16 of the 19 WB-affiliated stations that the company owned at the time, with WNOL being named as the New Orleans affiliate of the network. Channel 38 became a charter affiliate of The CW when the network commenced operations on September 18, 2006. UPN affiliate WUPL (channel 54), which was owned by CBS at the time (it is now owned by Tegna), became an affiliate of MyNetworkTV, a competing network developed by the Fox Television Stations and Twentieth Television subsidiaries of News Corporation.

Unusual for a duopoly, even after Tribune acquired WNOL, its operations remained separate from WGNO; the station continued to be based at a facility located on Canal Street. In February 2007, Tribune announced that rather than moving WGNO to WNOL's facility, that channel 26 would instead move to The Galleria building in nearby Metairie. As a result, WNOL merged its operations with WGNO within its studio space at the Galleria.

On April 1, 2012, Tribune Broadcasting removed all WNOL, WGNO, and its then 21 other television stations from satellite provider DirecTV due to a carriage dispute over an increase in payments to transmit the stations' signals. DirecTV signed a new carriage agreement with Tribune on April 4, 2012, restoring both stations as well as the other Tribune-owned stations on DirecTV.

Aborted sale to Sinclair; sale to Nexstar

Sinclair Broadcast Group entered into an agreement to acquire Tribune Media on May 8, 2017, for $3.9 billion, plus the assumption of $2.7 billion in Tribune debt. The deal received significant scrutiny over Sinclair's forthrightness in its applications to sell certain conflict properties, prompting the FCC to designate it for hearing and leading Tribune to terminate the deal and sue Sinclair for breach of contract.

Following the Sinclair deal's collapse, Nexstar Media Group of Irving, Texas, announced its purchase of Tribune Media on December 3, 2018, for $6.4 billion in cash and debt. The sale was completed on September 19, 2019.

Programming
Syndicated programs broadcast by WNOL-TV include Jerry Springer, How I Met Your Mother, Family Guy, Seinfeld, and Modern Family. Occasionally as time permits, WNOL may take on the responsibility of airing ABC network programs when WGNO is unable to in the event of extended breaking news or severe weather coverage (such as when major hurricanes affect the New Orleans area).

WNOL aired the CW network's prime time schedule on a one-hour tape delay (airing it from 8:00 to 10:00 p.m., instead of the recommended 7:00 to 9:00 p.m. slot for the network's Central Time Zone affiliates). This scheduling was implemented on June 7, 2007, following the cancellation of the WGNO-produced 9:00 p.m. newscast; syndicated programs instead filled the 7:00 p.m. hour (sister stations KWGN-TV in Denver and KPLR-TV in St. Louis also air The CW's prime time schedule in this manner; however unlike WNOL, both stations air local newscasts as lead-ins to the lineup). Sometime in 2022, this practice was discontinued, and WNOL now airs The CW's prime time schedule from 7:00 to 9:00 p.m. in pattern with other affiliates in the Central and Eastern time zones.

Newscasts
Sister station WGNO began producing a half-hour prime time newscast at 9:00 p.m. for WNOL-TV on May 1, 2006; the weeknight-only newscast competed against a longer established hour-long in-house newscast on Fox affiliate WVUE-DT (channel 8) and gained a competitor in June 2007, when WUPL began airing a half-hour prime time newscast produced by WWL-TV (channel 4) in that timeslot. The program suffered from dismal ratings, which resulted in the cancellation of the newscast after a four-year run; the program aired for the last time on June 4, 2010.

As a result of the newscast's cancellation, WNOL was one of only two Tribune-owned television stations that did not carry daily newscasts (alongside WCCT/Hartford–New Haven). Although WGNO no longer produced a newscast for WNOL, channel 38 continues to carry other local programs produced by WGNO; the station airs rebroadcasts of WGNO's business program NOLA Marketplace seven days a week and that station's public affairs program The 411 on Sunday mornings (two hours after its original 6:30 a.m. broadcast on channel 26).

Technical information

Subchannels
The station's digital signal is multiplexed:

Analog-to-digital conversion
WNOL shut down its analog signal, over UHF channel 38, on June 12, 2009, the official date in which full-power television stations in the United States transitioned from analog to digital broadcasts under federal mandate. The station's digital signal continued to broadcast on its pre-transition UHF channel 15. Through the use of PSIP, digital television receivers display the station's virtual channel as its former UHF analog channel 38. As previously mentioned, the station upgraded its feed from 480i standard definition to 1080i high definition with the transition and the relocation of WGNO to a separate digital channel.

References

External links
 
  – WGNO

Television stations in New Orleans
The CW affiliates
Court TV affiliates
Comet (TV network) affiliates
Charge! (TV network) affiliates
Nexstar Media Group
Television channels and stations established in 1984
1984 establishments in Louisiana